The Étoile des Espoirs was an end of the season French cycling stage race. It was created 
by Jean Leulliot, and was open to young professional cyclists.

Winners 
Source

References

External links

Cycle races in France
Defunct cycling races in France